Thomasville Heights is a neighborhood in southeast Atlanta, Georgia.

References

Neighborhoods in Atlanta